Acaena caesiiglauca (common name: glaucous pirri-pirri-bur or silver-leafed New Zealand burr) is a species of Acaena. Aceana caesiiglauca grow to a height of 2–4 inches and a spread of about 2 ft. The flowers consist of reddish burrs and its foliage is described as a silky bluish grey.

References

External links

caesiiglauca
Garden plants of New Zealand